The Shamer's Daughter (Danish: Skammerens datter) is a 2015 Danish action fantasy film, directed by . It was based on Lene Kaaberbøl's eponymous book.

Plot 
The King of Dunark has been murdered along with his pregnant wife and his 4-year-old son. The apparent killer is the King's elder son, Nicodemus Ravens (Jakob Oftebro), and has been found dead drunk, holding a dagger in his hand. But so long as he does not admit to his crime, he cannot be found guilty. The Master of Law sends for Melussina Tonerre (Maria Bonnevie), a "witch" who has the gift of probing someone's mind. Although she sees Nicodemus' remorse for his past behavior, she finds no shame for the royal family's slaughter. To further the trial, Lord Drakan (Peter Plaugborg) goes and picks up Dina (Rebecca Emilie Satrup), Melussina's daughter, who has the same ability.

Cast 
 Rebecca Emilie Sattrup as Dina Tonerre
 Petra Maria Scott Nielsen as Rosa
 Peter Plaugborg as Drakan
 Maria Bonnevie as Melussina Tonerre (Dina's mother)
 Søren Malling as Master of Arms
 Roland Møller as Hannes, Master of Arm's assistant
 Jakob Oftebro as Nicodemus Ravens ("Nico")
 Stina Ekblad as Lady Lizea
 Allan Hyde as Davin
 Laura Bro as Ms. Petri
 Olaf Johannessen as Master Maunus
 Jóhann G. Jóhansson as Dres
 Adam Ild Rohweder as Aun

Sequels 
The second part of the saga  finished post production in late 2018 and premiered on 24 January 2019.

References

External links 
 

2010s fantasy adventure films
2015 films
Danish fantasy adventure films
Films shot in the Czech Republic
2010s Danish-language films
Films with screenplays by Anders Thomas Jensen